Gaharpur is one of the Village in Gyanpur Mandal in Sant Ravidas Nagar District in Uttar Pradesh State. Gaharpur is 15 km far from its District Main City Gyanpur . It is 200 km far from its State Main City Lucknow

Demographics 
As of 2001 India census, Gaharpur had a population of 1651. Males constitute 55%(903) of the population and females 45%(748)

References 

http://censusindia.gov.in/PopulationFinder/Sub_Districts_Master.aspx?state_code=09&district_code=68
http://wikimapia.org/#lat=25.2943388&lon=82.4205744&z=14&l=0&m=b&show=/25891342/Gaharpur&search=gaharpur

Villages in Bhadohi district